Delijan County is in Markazi province, Iran. The capital of the county is the city of Delijan. At the 2006 census, the county's population was 43,388 in 12,578 households. The following census in 2011 counted 48,986 people in 14,879 households. At the 2016 census, the county's population was 51,621 in 16,453 households.

Administrative divisions

The population history of Delijan County's administrative divisions over three consecutive censuses is shown in the following table. The latest census shows one district, four rural districts, and two cities.

References

 

Counties of Markazi Province